The Grenoble Congress was the fourth national congress of the French Socialist Party (Parti socialiste or PS). It took place from 22 to 24 June 1973.

Results

François Mitterrand was re-elected as First Secretary.

References

Congresses of the Socialist Party (France)
1973 in France
1973 in politics
1973 conferences